East Marden is a village on the spur of the South Downs in the Chichester district of West Sussex, England. It is within the civil parish of Marden, West Sussex. It is first mentioned in the Domesday Book as Meredone and was given in 1086 to Roger, Earl of Montgomery. The church, St Peters (UK Ordnance Survey grid reference SU807145), dates from the 12th century and is still used for worship every other Sunday. Its oldest house today dates back to 1728 ( Salzman, 1953). The village, some 100 metres above sea level, is in an area of unusually high rainfall. Its most famous landmark is the thatched well on the village green. The population has remained static for over a century. It is in the civil parish of Compton.

Notes

References
Salzman, L.F (1953,reprinted 1973) A History of the county of West Sussex: The Rape of Chichester, pp 107–108

External links

Villages in West Sussex